Saxparty 5 is a 1978 Ingmar Nordströms studio album. In 1991, it was re-released on CD.

Track listing
Why Did it Have To Be Me
Den ensamme herden
Säg det om igen
(If You Ever Come To) Amsterdam
Silvermåne över bergen
Sommar och sol och semester
Exodus
Poinciana
Love System
Farväl San Diego
Candle On the Water
Tack ska du ha
Oh, Mein Papa
Mah-Na, Mah-Na

Charts

References 

1978 albums
Ingmar Nordströms albums